Mona Mostafa Mohamed is an Egyptian doctor and head of the Cancer Biology Research Laboratory at Cairo University in Giza, Egypt. In 2005 she was granted the Avon Foundation-AACR International Scholar Award for her dedication to breast cancer research. Mohamed is known for her research on locally activated breast cancer, metastatic breast cancer, and inflammatory breast cancer.

Education and career 
Mohamed has a B.S. (1991) and a Ph.D. (2002) from Cairo University. She was a postdoctoral researcher at Wayne State School of Medicine from 2005 until 2007. In 2007, she was awarded a start up fund from the Avon Foundation to create the first research lab in Egypt specific to studying breast cancer biology which is located at Cairo University. As of 2022 she is an associate professor at Cairo University.

Mohamed is known for her work in breast cancer, particularly on the role of multi functional enzymes. Her research has examined the conditions for women with inflammatory breast cancer in Egpyt, and white blood cells from patients with inflammatory breast cancer.

Selected publications

Awards and honors 
In 2005, Mohamed won the Avon Foundation International Scholar Award in Breast Cancer Research. In 2012, she was admitted into the United States' State Departments' Women in Science Hall of Fame for the Middle East and North Africa. In 2014 she was awarded the Arab Women Organization Prize in Science and Technology.

References

External links 
 

Living people
Year of birth missing (living people)
Cairo University alumni

Academic staff of Cairo University
Cancer researchers
Egyptian scientists
Egyptian women scientists